The 2020–21 Mercer Bears men's basketball team represented Mercer University during the 2020–21 NCAA Division I men's basketball season. The team were led by second-year head coach Greg Gary, and played their home games at Hawkins Arena in Macon, Georgia as a member of the Southern Conference.

Previous season
The Bears finished the 2019–20 season 17–15, 11–7 in SoCon play to finish in fourth place. They lost in the quarterfinals of the SoCon tournament to Western Carolina.

Roster

Schedule and results

|-
!colspan=12 style=| Regular season

|-
!colspan=12 style=| SoCon tournament
|-

Source:

References

Mercer Bears men's basketball seasons
Mercer Bears
Mercer Bears men's basketball
Mercer Bears men's basketball